Joseph Henry Prince (30 September 1885 – 7 November 1970) was an Australian rules footballer who played for St Kilda, South Melbourne and Carlton in the Victorian Football League (VFL).

St Kilda recruited Prince from Preston but he failed to make an impact in his two seasons and returned to the VFA club during the 1909 football season. He got another opportunity at South Melbourne and had much more success, playing regularly as a wingman and appearing in their 1912 and 1914 losing Grand Finals. They were eventually premiers in 1918, Prince's last season, but he wasn't a member of the side, having only managed two appearances that year. He finished his career at Carlton, where he added a further ten matches.

References

Holmesby, Russell and Main, Jim (2007). The Encyclopedia of AFL Footballers. 7th ed. Melbourne: Bas Publishing.

External links

1885 births
Australian rules footballers from Victoria (Australia)
St Kilda Football Club players
Sydney Swans players
Carlton Football Club players
Preston Football Club (VFA) players
1970 deaths